Meera is an Indian actress who has done Tamil- and Malayalam-language films of nineties as a heroine as well as supporting actress. She is noted for her performance  in Sukham Sukhakaram, Kottappurathe Koottukudumbam and Amma Ammaayiyamma.

Partial filmography

References

https://web.archive.org/web/20140726163441/http://www.nthwall.com/ml/Meera/celebrities/4564105573

External links

Actresses from Kerala
Living people
Actresses in Malayalam cinema
Indian film actresses
Year of birth missing (living people)
Indian child actresses
20th-century Indian actresses
21st-century Indian actresses
Actresses in Tamil cinema
Actresses in Telugu cinema
Actresses in Tamil television